Bhimambika temple or Bheemavva temple, is a popular Mutt and temple located in the temple town of Itagi in Gadag District, Ron Taluk in Karnataka. It is About 13 km from Gajendragad Kalkaleshwara temple.

Historical temple

Bhimambika devi was a Shiva Sharane and always immersed in God and helped many people through her guru tattwa, love and compassion and advised them to lead a pious life. She is believed to have performed many miracles and bestowed blessings on her devotees. 

Currently 8th generation of her family members are taking care of the mutt.

Transport 
Nearest towns/ cities to Itagi are Gajendragad, Ron, Gadag which are easily accessible by buses and autos. nearest railway station is Gadag.

See also

 Gajendragad
 Sudi
 Ron
 North Karnataka
 Tourism in North Karnataka
 Badami, Pattadakal, Aihole, Mahakuta
 Kuknur
 Mahadeva Temple (Itagi)
 Gadag District

References 

Cities and towns in Gadag district
Hindu temples in Gadag district
Shiva temples in Karnataka
Articles lacking sources from December 2009